Adolph H. Kemper (September 6, 1880 – July 2, 1954) was a member of the South Dakota House of Representatives.

Biography
Kemper was born on September 6, 1880, in Lancaster, Wisconsin. He died in a traffic accident on July 2, 1954, in Salem, South Dakota.

Career
Kemper was a member of the South Dakota House of Representatives from 1941 to 1944. He was a Republican. Kemper was elected from Sioux Falls, where he had lived.

References

External links

Politicians from Sioux Falls, South Dakota
People from Lancaster, Wisconsin
Republican Party members of the South Dakota House of Representatives
1880 births
1954 deaths
20th-century American politicians